Man of the World 2019 was the 3rd edition of the  Man of the World pageant. It was held on 11 July 2019 at Filoil Flying V Centre in  San Juan City, Philippines. Cao Xuân Tài of Vietnam crowned Daniel Georgiev of Bulgaria at the end of the event. Prime Event Productions Philippines (PEPPS), which organizes the pageant, let go of Georgiev because he declined to sign an exclusive contract with the organization. First Runner-Up Jin Kyu Kim of South Korea took over the title on July 29, 2020.

Results

Fast Track Event

Special Awards 

§ Automatic placement in the Top 18

Contestants

Notes

Crossover 
Minor competitions
 Mister Universal Ambassador
 2017:  - Carlos Márquez Saez

References 

Man of the World (pageant)
2019 beauty pageants
July 2019 events in the Philippines